Lobaye is one of the 16 prefectures of the Central African Republic. Its capital is Mbaïki. Emperor Duy Tân of Vietnam died here on December 26, 1945 in a plane crash. David Dacko, the first and third president of the Central African Republic from 1960-1965 and 1979–1981, was from Lobaye.

Location

The prefecture is located in the southern part of the country, bordering the Republic of the Congo and the Democratic Republic of the Congo. It shares borders with the prefectures of Mambéré-Kadéï to the northwest, Sangha-Mbaéré to the west, and Ombella-M'Poko to the northeast.
It is named for the Lobaye River.

Economy

Besides Mbaïki, other important cities include Boda, in the north, and Mongoumba, by the Ubangi River.
Most of the inhabitants are coffea farmers. Most of the farmers are extremely poor; most children do not go to college, and many die due to lack of medical care.

References

 
Prefectures of the Central African Republic